Leucotmemis nexa is a moth of the subfamily Arctiinae. It was described by Gottlieb August Wilhelm Herrich-Schäffer in 1854. It is found in Mexico, Guatemala, Costa Rica, Nicaragua, Colombia, Bolivia and northern Brazil.

References

 
Encyclopedia of Life

Leucotmemis
Moths described in 1854